Gate to Heaven is a 2019 historical drama film directed by Jivan Avetisyan, with scriptwriter Artavazd Yeghiazaryan, and co-scriptwriter Mko Malkhasyan. It is an international co-production by producers in Lithuania, Germany, and France and post-production producers in Czech Republic and Bulgaria along with the collaboration of the National Cinema Center of Armenia, with musical composition by Italian composer Michele Josia.

Set during the 2016 four-day war in Nagorno-Karabakh in the Caucasus Mountains, the story centers around Robert Sternvall (Richard Sammel), a German journalist who returns to the region to cover the armed conflict. During his journalistic investigation, Robert meets a young opera singer (Tatiana Spivakova), who happens to be the daughter of missing photojournalist Edgar Martirosyan, whom Robert had previously abandoned in captivity during the fall of the village of Talish in 1992. Robert and Sophia's frequent rendezvouses ignite a passionate romance. The film also features Sos Janibekyan, Naira Zakaryan, Leo Pobedonoscevas Benedict Freitag, Nina Kronjager, Armen Sargsyan, Aram Karakhanyan, and Elfik Zohrabyan in supporting roles.

Gate to Heaven held a private premiere in Yerevan, Armenia on 17 October 2019. Armenia's Prime Minister, Nikol Pashinyan and Ministry of Foreign Affairs, Zohrab Mnatsakanyan were also in attendance. It was among 28 selected projects by the European Work in Progress Cologne which was held in October 2019.

Plot
In April 2016, Robert Sternvall (Richard Sammel), a German journalist, learns about the resumption of military actions in Nagorno-Karabakh and leaves Berlin to cover them. The articles on Operation "Koltso" ("Ring") during the first war in Karabakh brought him great fame years ago. This time his car is bombed and he is taken to a hospital in Yerevan. While the local journalist Michael Movsisyan is suspended from works for endangering Robert's life, Robert is invited to a charity opera concert in Yerevan with the participation of a young opera singer Sophia Marti and French tenor Jean Milosh who is courting her.

After the concert, Robert, fascinated by Sophia, suggests arranging a photo shooting and writing an article about her. Soon Robert and Sophia's relationship becomes warmer and takes a romantic turn thus triggering Jeans' fierce jealousy. Sophia suggests Robert visit her favorite childhood place – a gorge known as the "Gate to Heaven", which she used to visit with her late father, photographer Edgar Martirosyan. Edgar had been taken prisoner and killed during the war in 1992. Nevertheless, Robert fails to turn up at the agreed time; instead, he takes a flight to Germany. Meanwhile, during his private investigation, Michael discovers the dark side of Robert's life.

Robert is getting ready for his grand exhibition in Berlin. Sophia comes to the opening ceremony and urges Robert to tell the true reasons of his visit to Talish. It is revealed that the photos, presenting the horrors of the Operation "Koltso" in Talish, were taken by Edgar Martirosyan. Furthermore, Edgar and Robert had met in Talish. On the day of Talish's fall, when defending his own house with a gun, Edgar passed all the photos to Robert for him to take them to the Artsakh press. Instead, Robert appropriated them and published them under his name, while Edgar was captured. Years later, when the military operations restart in Talish, Robert decided not only to cover the developments, but also to find Edgar's relatives and extend his apologies to them. However, after meeting Sophia and learning about her origins, he feels unable to confess at the last moment.

Sophia leaves. Shortly afterwards Robert publishes his book Confession at the Gate to Heaven, where he reveals the truth about these events and republishes the photos under Edgar's name. Michael visits Sophia at her parental house in Talish and gives her the book.

Cast
 Richard Sammel (Germany) – as Robert Sternvall
 Tatiana Spivakova (France) – as Sophia Marti
 Sos Janibekyan (Armenia) –as Michael Movsisyan
 Naira Zakaryan (US) –as Tereza Poghosyan
 Leo Pobedonoscevas (Lithuania) – as Jean Milosh
 Benedict Freitag (Germany)- as Eduard Hoffman
 Nina Kronjager (Germany) – as Laura Sternvall
 Armen Sargsyan (Armenia) –as Edgar Martirosyan
 Roffi Petrossian (Armenia) – as young Robert Sternvall
 Arthur Manukyan (Armenia) – as Father Grigor
 Martin Aloyan (Armenia) – as Norayr Gharabekyan (Conductor)
 Mikayel Hajyan (Armenia) – as Hakob Varanosyan 
 Arsen Ghazaryan (Armenia) – as Doctor Arakelyan
 Aram Karakhanyan (Armenia) – as James Colbert
 Elfik Zohrabyan (Armenia)- as German Journalist

Filmmaker
 Director -  Jivan Avetisyan (Armenia)
 Scriptwriter - Artavazd Yeghiazaryan (Armenia)
 Co – Scriptwriter - Mko Malkhasyan (USA)
 Producers - Masis Baghdasaryan (Armenia), Kestutis Drazdauskas (Lithuania)
 Executive Producer:  Adrineh Mirzayan (USA)
 Supervising Producers - Arthur Chalekian (USA), Garo Madenlian (USA)
 Co – Producers - Marco Gilles (Germany), Angelika Schouler (France)
 Associate Producers - Shushanik Mirzakhanyan (Armenia), Vahe Gabrache (Switzerland), Peter Baghdassarian (USA),  Robert Hofferer (Austria), Philipp Egger (Switzerland),  Orietta Trevisanato (Italy)
 Post - Production Producers - Teodora Andretsudi (Bulgaria),  Daniel Delchunkov (Bulgaria), Martin Raiman (Czech Republic), Steve Reverand (Czech Republic)
 Line Producer - Narine Voskanyan (Armenia)
 Director of Photography - Rytis Kurkulis (Lithuania)
 Art Directors - Sevakn Baghdasaryan (Armenia), Jurgita Gerdvilaitė (Lithuania)
 Music - Michele Josia (Italy)
 Music Publisher - Giovanni Marolaa (Italy)
 Editing Director - Eimantas Belickas (Lithuania)

Awardes and Participations

References

External links

 Foreign Minister Zohrab Mnatsakanyan received the film crew of the "Gate to Heaven"

English-language Armenian films
2019 films
Films directed by Jivan Avetisyan
Armenian drama films
2010s historical drama films